The Sistema Integral de Tren Ligero (SITREN) (Spanish for Light Rail Integral System) (formerly PreTren) is the semi-articulated bus service which feeds the Sistema de Tren Eléctrico Urbano in Jalisco, Mexico. It started operations on January 5, 2007. It serves the municipalities of Guadalajara, Zapopan and Tonalá.

History

Sistema Auxiliar de Enlace 
The history of the light rail feeder buses began with a project called the Auxiliary Link System (Spanish: Sistema Auxiliar de Enlace) (SAE). On February 1, 1995, SITEUR presented a project aimed at increasing user acquisition. Based on the experiences of other transport systems in the world, it was contemplated to integrate feeder routes that would be shared between the then two existing train lines. The routes would be placed strategically and based on studies on the areas with the highest influx of passengers.

Eight routes were proposed, which were: Dermatológico - Los Belenes (Telmex Auditorium), Tesoro - Las Águilas (López Mateos Sur), 18 de Marzo - Industrial Zone, Oblatos - CUCEI, San Andrés - Circunvalación Oblatos, San Jacinto - Pila Seca (Tlaquepaque), La Aurora - Beatriz Hernández and Tetlán - New Guadalajara Bus Station.

On January 29, 1996, the system began operations with 7 of the 8 proposed routes —the 18 de Marzo - Industrial Zone route was postponed due to technical issues—. The transfer from the train to the buses and vice versa was free. The routes were covered by 22 buses + 5 in reserve. The service was operated in a coordinated manner between SITEUR and the state-owned Servicios y Transportes (SyT).

The service was temporarily stopped on November 28, 1998, justifying on the lack of units and drivers, as well as low demand. However, the service was never put back into circulation.

Pre-Tren 
On January 5, 2007, the operations of what was then called PreTren began, which connected the center of the city with the western zone of Zapopan. The route starts at the Juárez station of Line 2 and ends at the Zapopan bus station.

The route started at Av. Juárez and Calzada del Federalismo, continued along Av. Vallarta to the Periférico Beltway, then returned along Av. Vallarta to the Glorieta Minerva, deviating along Av. López Mateos Norte and running through Av. Hidalgo until Calzada del Federalismo, ready to start the journey again.

It has a special service on Sundays, since the Vía RecreActiva (a biking route) obstructs the route at one section, so in order to avoid suspending the service, it circulates on an alternate route.

SiTren 
On January 29, 2015, the governor of Jalisco, Aristóteles Sandoval, announced the start of an expansion of what was then called PreTren, although now under the name of SITREN, an acronym for Sistema Integral del Tren Ligero (Spanish for Light Rail Integral System).

Line 2 began operations on Tuesday, February 3, 2015. This line was planned for the municipality of Tonalá, serving the neighborhoods of Zalatitán, Basilio Vadillo, Bosques de Tonalá and Educadores. Its route begins at the Tetlán station of line 2 of SITEUR and continues along the avenues María Reyes, Juárez (Zalatitán), Gigantes, Ruperto García del Alba, Juan Gil Preciado (Tonalá), Encino, Juan de Dios Robledo, De los Maestros, Tonaltecas and ends at the Emiliano Zapata Street until the Glorieta to the Tonalteca Crafts. It returns through Zaragoza Street and then back to Tetlán. This line was of great importance since Tonalá suffers from a serious lag in terms of public transport and the quality of its streets and avenues is extremely poor.

Line 3 started operations on February 2, 2016, replacing the old trolleybus route 400, now under SITEUR authority. It follows the same 34 km route that the original route had, from Felipe Ángeles street to the vicinity of the Glorieta Minerva. It has 54 stops.

It is important to mention that for this line only modern trolleybuses were acquired with the capacity to disconnect from the catenaries in case of breakdown or incidents on the roads so as not to obstruct the streets. Twenty five units were purchased, of which five had card recharge machines.

On November 26, 2018, the system was expanded with the addition of Line 4, starting in Zapopan and ending in Valle de los Molinos. This line arose with the idea of feeding line 3 of SITEUR, then still under construction.

On October 15, an agreement was signed creating an extension of line 1, denominated Line 1-B. This extension arose due to the need for transportation of the students of the University Center of Biological and Agricultural Sciences (CUCBA). The route solves a 40-year-problem, since public transport to and from the university center had always been poor. In addition, this route benefited the workers of El Bajío, an area through which this line runs.

Service

Fleet 
A total of twenty seven units serve Line 1, of which 3 have disabled access, across 27 stations (plus eight that are used on Sundays on an alternate track, since a section of its route is closed on that day), It runs from 5:00 to 23:00 hours. Line 1-B is served by 7 units (2 with disabled access), while Line 2 is served by 22 units (3 with disabled access). Line 3 counts with 25 trolleybuses, all with disabled access. Line 4 has 33 units serving the route (6 of which have disabled access).

Payment system 
The toll payment system is through the Smart Card that can be acquired at the Light Rail facilities as well as at various shops and services located along the Vallarta corridor. Payment with cash is also possible, depositing the exact amount in a slot machine that the buses have at the entrance; the machine does not return exchange.

Characteristics

Monitoring system 
The system implements state-of-the-art technology that allows detailed monitoring of the quality of the service provided to its users; this is done by logging bus operation telemetry, especially driving telemetry, such as acceleration, braking, travel time, punctual departures and arrivals at the terminals.

Support for ecology 
The SITREN helps reduce pollutants that are dumped into the environment, guaranteeing the efficient use of fuel since all buses comply with the EPA 98 ecological standard, apart from the fact that their transmission is automatic and not manual. In addition, due to its system of predefined stops, the bus makes fewer starts, generating less pollution.

Disabled Access Units 
The provision to equip more than 10% of the buses with special platforms for users with reduced mobility is also complied with; two to four buses are equipped with said platforms on each line.

Operation 
According to INEGI data, the first two SITREN routes operate with 38 units during the week and 25 on Saturdays and Sundays. That same year, the units transported 4,901,737 passengers (of which 34,608 paid with a discount), 408,478 per month on average.

Line 3 is not included since INEGI counts it separately because it considers the line a type of electric transport, like the urban rail.

Lines

Line 1

Line 1-B

Line 2

Line 3 (Trolleybus)

Line 4

See also 

 Sistema de Tren Eléctrico Urbano
 Guadalajara trolleybus
 Mi Macro

References

External links 

  – Official website.

Transportation in Guadalajara, Jalisco
Buses by type
Guadalajara light rail system